Nuruddin Chowdhury Noyon (born 16 December 1964) is a Bangladesh Awami League politician and the incumbent Jatiya Sangsad member representing the Lakshmipur-2 constituency.

Career 
Noyon is the general secretary of Laxmipur district Awami League. On 28 January 2021, Mohammad Shahid Islam, a Member of Parliament from Laxmipur-2 constituency, was sentenced to 7 years imprisonment by a criminal court in Kuwait. On 11 February 2021, he lost his seat as a Member of Parliament under Articles 66 and 67 of the Constitution of Bangladesh.

Noyon was elected Member of Parliament on 28 June 2021 in the by-election of zero seats.

References 

Living people
1964 births
People from Lakshmipur District
Awami League politicians
11th Jatiya Sangsad members